Saphenista chanostium is a species of moth of the family Tortricidae. It is found in Ecuador in the provinces of Napo and Morona-Santiago.

The wingspan is about 26 mm. The ground colour of the forewings is cream, suffused with yellow along the costa and subterminally and with brownish dorsally and apically. The hindwings are brownish grey, but brownish at the wing apex.

Etymology
The species name refers to the shape of the ostium and is derived from Greek chanos (meaning open mouth).

References

Moths described in 2009
Saphenista